VIT, C.A. (Venezolana de Industria Tecnológica, Compañía Anónima) is a Venezuelan manufacturer of desktop computers and laptops, supported by the Venezuelan government and a Chinese information technology company Inspur (former ). The first computer they produced was called Computador Bolivariano (English: Bolivarian Computer), which came with the Kubuntu Linux operating system.

Since April 28, 2009, VIT computers are pre-installed with Canaima GNU/Linux.

By 2015, the second production line was expanded, which increased the assembly capacity of servers and computers by 150,000 units.

See also
 Canaima (operating system)
 GendBuntu
 Inspur
 LiMux
 Nova (operating system)
 Ubuntu Kylin

Notes

External links 

 VIT homepage 
 Ministry of Science and Technology 
  

Companies established in 2005
Computer hardware companies
Government-owned companies of Venezuela
Manufacturing companies of Venezuela
Venezuelan brands